Güney is a town and district of Denizli Province, Turkey.

Güney is the Turkish word for "south" and may refer to:

People
 Güney (name)

Places
 Güney, Acıpayam
 Güney, Bolvadin, a village in the district of Bolvadin, Afyonkarahisar Province, Turkey
 Güney, Bozdoğan, a village in the district of Bozdoğan, Aydın Province, Turkey
 Güney, Burdur, a town in the Yeşilova district, Burdur Province, Turkey
 Güney, Çamlıdere, a village in the district of Çamlıdere, Ankara Province, Turkey
 Güney, Çorum
 Güney, İspir
 Güney, Mengen, a village in the District of Mengen, Bolu Province, Turkey
 Güney, Sinanpaşa, a village in the district of Sinanpaşa, Afyonkarahisar Province, Turkey
 Güney, Yığılca